Hymenarcys is a genus of stink bugs in the family Pentatomidae. There are about five described species in Hymenarcys.

Species
These five species belong to the genus Hymenarcys:
 Hymenarcys aequalis (Say, 1832)
 Hymenarcys crassa Uhler, 1897
 Hymenarcys nervosa (Say, 1832)
 Hymenarcys reticulata (Stål, 1872)
 † Hymenarcys cridlandi Lewis, 1969

References

Further reading

External links

 

Pentatomidae genera
Articles created by Qbugbot
Pentatomini